Little Whitefish Lake (Seguin) Water Aerodrome  is located  north of MacTier, Ontario, Canada.

References

Registered aerodromes in Ontario
Seaplane bases in Ontario